Eyrgun (also Romanized as Eyrgūn) is a village in Gafr and Parmon Rural District, Gafr and Parmon District, Bashagard County, Hormozgan Province, Iran. At the 2006 census, its population was 27, in 6 families.

References 

Populated places in Bashagard County